Lackland Air Force Base CDP is a census-designated place (CDP) covering the permanent residential population of the Lackland Air Force Base in Bexar County, Texas, United States. Per the 2020 census, the population was 9,467.

Demographics

2020 census

Note: the US Census treats Hispanic/Latino as an ethnic category. This table excludes Latinos from the racial categories and assigns them to a separate category. Hispanics/Latinos can be of any race.

2000 census
As of the census of 2000, there were 7,123 people, 174 households, and 152 families residing on the base. The population density was 642.6/km2 (1,662.6/mi2). There were 412 housing units at an average density of 37.2/km2 (96.2/mi2). The racial makeup of the town was 65.20% White, 19.01% Black or African American, 0.86% Native American, 3.64% Asian, 0.32% Pacific Islander, 2.20% from other races, and 8.77% from two or more races. 13.77% of the population were Hispanic or Latino of any race.

There were 174 households, out of which 79.9% had children under the age of 18 living with them, 73.0% were married couples living together, 9.2% had a female householder with no husband present, and 12.6% were non-families. 12.1% of all households were made up of individuals. The average household size was 3.49 and the average family size was 3.78.

On the base the population was spread out, with 5.3% under the age of 18, 79.8% from 18 to 24, 14.5% from 25 to 44, 0.4% from 45 to 64, and none who were 65 years of age or older. The median age was 20 years. For every 100 females, there were 256 males. For every 100 females age 18 and over, there were 267.3 males.

The median income for a household in the base was $32,250, and the median income for a family was $31,923. Males had a median income of $16,435 versus $15,572 for females. The per capita income for the base was $10,048. 7.3% of the population and 6.9% of families were below the poverty line. Out of the total population, 7.3% of those under the age of 18 were living below the poverty line.

References

Census-designated places in Bexar County, Texas